Gulran is a village in Herat Province, Afghanistan. It is the center of the Gulran District. Like other parts of Herat province the population is overwhelmingly Tajik with small pockets of Pashtun population.

Climate
Gulran has a cold steppe climate (Köppen: BSk) with very hot summers and cool winters.

References

See also
Herat Province

Populated places in Herat Province